The Salt Lake City, Utah, area includes many diverse media outlets, not only found within the official city boundaries, but also in the greater Wasatch Front urban area.

Newspapers

Major daily
 Daily Herald, Provo - daily morning news
 Deseret Morning News, Salt Lake City - daily morning news
 The Herald Journal, Logan - daily morning news
 The Salt Lake Tribune, Salt Lake City - daily morning news
 Standard-Examiner, Ogden - daily morning news

Alternative

 El Semanal Magazine - free bi-weekly, family-oriented and independent media. Written entirely in Spanish.
CATALYST Magazine - monthly environmental, spirituality, health, arts and politics magazine
NOW Salt Lake - free monthly entertainment magazine
QSaltLake - bi-weekly free gay and lesbian news
Salt Lake City Weekly - weekly free alternative
Salt Lake Free Press - free weekly alternative; news and entertainment

College
 BYU NewsNet - Brigham Young University 
 The Daily Universe - Brigham Young University 
Daily Utah Chronicle - daily student paper, University of Utah 
The Globe - twice a week, Salt Lake Community College 
Hard News Cafe - Utah State University's journalism and communication department online newspaper 
Schooled Magazine - Utah Valley's student publication for BYU, UVU, and speciality college students; motto is "for the student, by the student" 
The Signpost - three times a week, Weber State University 
The Utah Statesman - award-winning campus newspaper published three times each week, produced entirely by students at Utah State University; distributed to on-campus locations and selected downtown locations every Monday, Wednesday and Friday of the academic school year 
 Venceremos student newspaper - the only bilingual student newspaper in  Utah 
Forum - fortnightly student paper of Westminster College, Salt Lake City

Magazines
El Semanal Magazine is a free bi-weekly independent printing media, published totally in Spanish since September 2001; news and entertainment, family oriented. www.elsemanalonline.com

architectureUTAH magazine - annual published by Silver King Media 
CATALYST Magazine - monthly environmental, spirituality, health, arts and politics magazine
Parent Fresh Magazine - monthly parenting magazine for discerning Utah families 
Salt Lake Magazine - bi-monthly local magazine
Schooled Magazine - monthly local BYU & UVU magazine 
SLUG Magazine - Salt Lake Underground music magazine
UGLY Magazine - digital tablet-based fashion, arts, and culture magazine
Utah Homes & Garden magazine - quarterly, published by Silver King Media 
Utah Valley Magazine - bi-monthly local magazine

Digital
24saltlake.com - news, weather, traffic and local events 
ksl.com - news, weather, traffic and local events 
utahpolicy.com - political news 
utahpoliticalcapitol.com - political news

Aggregators
UtahTweets - comprising information from Twitter streams

Television

Salt Lake City is the 30th largest television market, according to Nielsen.

Radio

Salt Lake City is the 31st largest radio market, according to Arbitron.

References

External links
Utah Radio Talk
Utah Internet radio
UTRadioGuide.com
Utah media guide

Salt Lake City
 
Salt Lake City media